Svealand Swedish is one of the six major groupings of Swedish dialects, spoken in Svealand.

A major characteristic of Svealand Swedish is the coalescence of the alveolar trill with following dental and alveolar consonants—also over word-boundaries—that transforms them into retroflex consonants that in some cases reduces the distinction between words (as for instance vana—varna, i.e. "habit"—"warn").  This feature is also found in East Norwegian, North Swedish and in some dialects of Scottish Gaelic.

  +  → 
  +  → 
  +  → 
  +  → 
A special development holds for rd:
  +  → 

One high-status variety of Swedish, that of the capital region of Stockholm–Uppsala, sometimes ambiguously designated as rikssvenska, belongs to Svealand Swedish, though  +  →  is employed instead of the traditional transformation to a flap.

Swedish dialects
Svealand